Temari may refer to:

Temari (toy), a traditional Japanese embroidered ball
Temari Sushi, a type of sushi
Temari Matsumoto (松本 テマリ), a Japanese manga artist
Temari (Naruto), a fictional character in the anime and manga series Naruto by Masashi Kishimoto
Temari (Shugo Chara!) a fictional character in the manga series Shugo Chara! by Peach-Pit

See also 
 Temario Rivera, a Filipino political scientist
 Temarii Tinorua, a Tahitian footballer
 Tamari (disambiguation)